Ümmühan Uçar Gürçay (born 1986 in Kütahya) is a Turkish weightlifter competing in the women's +75 kg division.

She started weightlifting at the age of 13 in the primary school, in the beginning against her parents' will. After two months' training, she achieved second place at the national championship that enabled her further performing in this sports.

Achievements 
European Championships

References 

1986 births
People from Kütahya
Living people
Turkish female weightlifters
European Weightlifting Championships medalists
20th-century Turkish sportswomen
21st-century Turkish sportswomen